Sterilize is the eighth studio album by American noise rock band Unsane, released September 29, 2017, through Southern Lord. The album was released digitally and physically on compact disc and vinyl formats, including a limited edition red LP pressing consisting of 300 copies.

To promote the album, the band toured during the summer leading up to the record's release as well as the following fall–winter season. Sterilize marks the first studio album by the group to be self-produced, as recording was primarily done by Dave Curran. The album was mixed at Acre, New York, by Andrew Schnieder in February that same year, and mastering was done by Carl Saff in Chicago, Illinois.

The album was included in the Rolling Stones "20 Best Metal Albums of 2017" list.

Track listing

Personnel
Chris Spencer - guitar, vocals, photography
Dave Curran - bass, vocals, recording
Vincent Signorelli – drums
Andrew Schnieder - mixing
Carl Saff - mastering
Alexander Mata - layout

References

External links
 
 Sterilize on Bandcamp

2017 albums
Southern Lord Records albums
Unsane albums